The Beer and Oktoberfest Museum in Munich deals with the history of beer and the Munich Oktoberfest.

The museum was opened on 7 September 2005 and is housed in an old town house in the old town from the year 1327. The building is accessed inside through a staircase, which is nearly 500 years old, has 43 steps and extends over four floors.

References

External links
 
 

2005 establishments in Germany
beer museums
museums in Munich
Oktoberfest